Tomas Francis (born 27 April 1992) is a Wales-international rugby union player who plays at tight head prop for Ospreys.

Club career
Francis signed his first professional contract with Doncaster Knights in February 2012 at the age of 19, he was playing for amateur club Malton and Norton RUFC when he signed for the Knights, where he had been playing from the age of 4. Francis signed with London Scottish in 2013 after Doncaster were relegated to National League 1, he made 23 appearances in one season for Scottish before being signed by Aviva Premiership side Exeter Chiefs for the 2014–15 season. He was a replacement as Exeter Chiefs defeated Wasps to be crowned champions of the 2016-17 English Premiership.

On 12 January 2021, Francis confirmed his move to Welsh region Ospreys in the Pro14 on a three-year deal from the 2021-22 season.

International career
On 20 January 2015, Wales head coach Warren Gatland said during a press conference that he had a long debate about whether to include Francis in the 34-man squad for the 2015 Six Nations Championship but had decided against it due to current back injuries Francis was carrying.

On 9 March 2015, Francis was called up to train with Wales.

On 16 March 2015, Francis was added to the Wales squad prior to the final Six Nations game against Italy.

On 2 June 2015, Francis was selected in Wales 47-man World Cup training squad.

On 29 August 2015, Francis made his Wales debut in a 16–10 World Cup warm-up victory over Ireland. He was called up as cover for the 2017 British & Irish Lions tour to New Zealand.

International tries

Personal life
He was educated at both Ampleforth College and Sedbergh School. Francis has a degree in Mechanical Engineering which he earned at the University of Leeds. He signed his first professional contract at Doncaster Knights while completing his studies.

Francis qualifies for Wales through his grandmother, Eirlys Walters, who was born in Abercraf.

References

External links

Exeter Chiefs Profile
London Scottish Profile

1992 births
Living people
Alumni of the University of Leeds
English people of Welsh descent
English rugby union players
Exeter Chiefs players
London Scottish F.C. players
People educated at Ampleforth College
Rugby union players from York
Rugby union props
Wales international rugby union players
Doncaster Knights players
Ospreys (rugby union) players